is a Japanese actress from Tokyo, Japan.

Career
Ito played a supporting role in Tokyo!. She also appeared in Kiyoshi Kurosawa's 2012 television drama Penance. and sang in the band Mean Machine.

Filmography

Film
 Samurai Kids (1993) – Chizuko Kusubayashi
 Swallowtail (1996) – Ageha
 Dr. Akagi (1998)
 All About Lily Chou-Chou (2001) – Yūko Kuno
 Owl (2003)
 Hana and Alice (2004)
 A Day on the Planet (2004) – Kate
 Riyu (2004) – Ayako Takarai
 Kagen no Tsuki (2004) – Sayaka Kamijo
 Curtain Call (2005) – Kaori Hashimoto
 Final Fantasy VII: Advent Children (2005) – Tifa Lockhart (voice)
 Last Order: Final Fantasy VII (2005) – Tifa Lockhart
 The Go Master (2006) – Kazuko Nakahara
 Crickets (2006) – Eiko
 Vanished (2006) – Chie
 Tokyo Tower: Mom and Me, and Sometimes Dad (2007) – Tamama
 Tokyo! (2008) – Akemi
 Be Sure to Share (2009) – Nakagawa Yoko
 Solanin (2010) – Ai Kotani
 Bandage (2010) – Nobuko Yukari
 Gantz (2011) – Eriko Ayukawa
 Soup (2012) – Mika Shibuya
 Konshin (2012) – Tamiko Sakamoto
 The Room (2012) – Yumi
 Yokomichi Yonosuke (2013) – Chiharu
 Flower of Shanidar (2013) – Yurie
 Judge! (2014) – Kiichiro Ota's former girlfriend
 Sekigahara (2017) – Hebishiro/Acha
 Cheer Boys!! (2019)
 Labyrinth of Cinema (2020) – Yoshiko Kawashima
 Noise (2022) – Chihiro Aoki
 Dr. Coto's Clinic 2022 (2022) – Rika Andō

Television
 Dr. Coto's Clinic (2003) – Rika Andō
 Midnight Diner (2011) – Ikumi/Miku
 Ohisama (2011) – Natsuko Takahashi
 Penance (2012) – Mayu Murakami
 Crime and Punishment: A Falsified Romance (2012) – Yoshio Tachi
 Never Let Me Go (2016) – Ruko Horie
 Poison Daughter, Holy Mother (2019)
 Tokyo Vice (2022)

Video games
 Kingdom Hearts II (2005) – Tifa Lockhart
 Dirge of Cerberus: Final Fantasy VII (2006) – Tifa Lockhart
 Dissidia 012 Final Fantasy (2011) – Tifa Lockhart
 Final Fantasy Explorers (2014) – Tifa Lockhart
 World of Final Fantasy (2016) – Tifa Lockhart
 Dissidia Final Fantasy: Opera Omnia (2017) – Tifa Lockhart
 Itadaki Street: Dragon Quest and Final Fantasy 30th Anniversary (2017) – Tifa Lockhart
 Dissidia Final Fantasy NT (2019) – Tifa Lockhart
 Final Fantasy VII Remake (2020) – Tifa Lockhart
 Crisis Core: Final Fantasy VII Reunion (2022) – Tifa Lockhart

References

External links
 Official agency profile 
 
 
 

1980 births
Living people
Japanese film actresses
Japanese television actresses
Japanese video game actresses
Japanese voice actresses
Voice actresses from Tokyo
20th-century Japanese actresses
21st-century Japanese actresses